The 1970 Belgian Grand Prix was a Formula One motor race held at Spa-Francorchamps on 7 June 1970. It was race 4 of 13 in both the 1970 World Championship of Drivers and the 1970 International Cup for Formula One Manufacturers.

March driver Chris Amon set the new lap record at this race, at a speed of 152 miles an hour. Race winner Pedro Rodríguez had set a 160 miles an hour lap in a sports car race the week before the Grand Prix. It was also Rodriguez's last victory in Formula One, and BRM's first victory since Jackie Stewart won the 1966 Monaco Grand Prix. This was the second Formula One win ever for a Mexican driver, and the last until the 2020 Sakhir Grand Prix. The race also saw the debut of Ignazio Giunti, who finished fourth in a Ferrari.

This was the last Formula One race to be held on the original Spa circuit. It was also the last Formula One victory for Dunlop.

Qualifying

Qualifying classification

Race

Classification

Championship standings after the race

Drivers' Championship standings

Constructors' Championship standings

Note: Only the top five positions are included for both sets of standings.

References

Belgian Grand Prix
Belgian Grand Prix
Grand Prix
June 1970 sports events in Europe